The Flyers Creek, a mostlyperennial river that is part of the Lachlan sub-catchment of the Murrumbidgee catchment within the Murray–Darling basin, is located in the Central West region of New South Wales, Australia. 

It is the site of a proposed windfarm project.

Course and features 

See also 

 List of rivers of New South Wales (A-K)
 Rivers of New South Wales

References

External links
 

Tributaries of the Lachlan River
Rivers of New South Wales
Cabonne Council
Cowra Shire